Barry Roberts (born 28 October 1937) is a former Australian rules footballer who played for the Fitzroy Football Club in the Victorian Football League (VFL).

Notes

External links 
		

Living people
1937 births
Australian rules footballers from Victoria (Australia)
Fitzroy Football Club players